Nebraska Highway 32 is a United States highway in Nebraska.  It runs for  through east central and eastern Nebraska.  Its western terminus is at Nebraska Highway 14 in Petersburg.  Its eastern terminus is at U.S. Highway 75 in Tekamah.

Route description
Nebraska Highway 32 begins in Petersburg at Nebraska Highway 14. It goes east from there through farmland and at the border separating Boone County and Madison County, it meets Nebraska Highway 45. It turns east, meets Nebraska Highway 121, then enters Madison. At the east end of Madison, NE 32 meets U.S. Highway 81. It continues east to West Point, Nebraska, meeting Nebraska Highway 57 and Nebraska Highway 15 between Madison and West Point. At West Point, NE 32 meets U.S. Highway 275 and they overlap in West Point. After separating from US 275, NE 32 turns east again and meets U.S. Highway 77 near Oakland. It continues east again and ends in Tekamah at U.S. Highway 75.

Major intersections

References

External links

The Nebraska Highways Page: Highways 31 to 60

032
Transportation in Boone County, Nebraska
Transportation in Madison County, Nebraska
Transportation in Stanton County, Nebraska
Transportation in Cuming County, Nebraska
Transportation in Burt County, Nebraska
U.S. Route 73